USS Ice Boat was a vessel borrowed from the City of Philadelphia, Pennsylvania, by the Union Navy when the American Civil War suddenly broke out. She was placed in service immediately and kept in service until she could be replaced by Union Navy vessels, built or borrowed, and then returned to Philadelphia.

Temporary assistance to the Union Navy 

Ice Boat, also known as Refrigerator and Release, was owned by the city of Philadelphia and offered to the Union Navy free of expense soon after the outbreak of the American Civil War. She was placed in service at Philadelphia 23 April 1861, Commodore Oliver S. Glisson in command.

Supporting the initial stability of the Potomac River area 

She departed Philadelphia, Pennsylvania, the same day to protect the landing of troops at Annapolis, Maryland, to encourage Maryland's adherence to the Union and to be available for the defense of Washington, D.C.

Ice Boat was ordered to Washington for duty in the Potomac River 21 May arriving two days later. Most of her service was off Aquia Creek where she labored to stop trade across the Potomac River between Virginia and Maryland, occasionally engaging Confederate batteries on the Virginia shore.

Defending the Nation’s Capital after Union loss at Bull Run 

News of the Union Army's defeat at the First Battle of Bull Run caused Ice Boat's return to Washington to defend the Nation's Capital. A fortnight later the ship was back off Aquia Creek where she remained until she was returned to her owner late in November 1861.

Commanding officers
During its seven months of service in the U.S. Navy, the Ice Boat served under the following officers:

References 

Ships of the Union Navy
Gunboats of the United States Navy
Steamships of the United States Navy
Ice trade